The following is a list of amusement parks in the Americas sorted by region.

North America

Canada

Alberta
Calaway Park, Calgary
Galaxyland, Edmonton

British Columbia
Aerial Adventure Park, Revelstoke
Castle Fun Park, Abbotsford
Cultus Lake Adventure Park, Cultus Lake
Cypress Mountain, West Vancouver
Playland, Vancouver
Rattlesnake Canyon, Osoyoos
Revelstoke Mountain Resort, Revelstroke

Manitoba
Tinkertown Family Fun Park, Winnipeg

New Brunswick
Magic Mountain, Moncton

Nova Scotia
Atlantic Splash Adventure, Hammonds Plains
Snow Queen Leisure World, Lower South River

Ontario
Blue Mountain Adventure Park, Blue Mountains
Canada's Wonderland, Vaughan
Centreville Amusement Park at Toronto Islands
Chippewa Park, Thunder Bay
Clifton Hill, Niagara Falls
Funhaven, Ottawa
House of Frankenstein, Niagara Falls
Marineland of Canada, Niagara Falls
Neb's Funworld, Oshawa
Santa's Village, Bracebridge
Storybook Park, Owen Sound
Storybook Gardens, London

Prince Edward Island
Sandspit Cavendish Beach, Cavendish 
Shining Waters Family Fun Park, Cavendish

Québec
Au Pays des Merveilles, Sainte-Adèle 
Camp Fortune, Chelsea
La Ronde: A Six Flags Park, Montréal
F.U.N Park, Saint-Saveur
Mega Parc, Québec City
Mont Saint-Sauveur, Piedmont
Parc Johnny Test at Ses Amis, Granby

Costa Rica
Parque de Diversiones Dr. Roberto Ortiz Brenes, San José

Cuba
Parque de diversiones en La Habana, La Habana
Parque de diversiones en Santiago, Santiago

Dominican Republic
Manati Park, Punta Cana

El Salvador
Sunset Park, La Libertad

Guatemala
Xetulul Theme Park, Retalhuleu

Jamaica
Anancy Fun Park, Negril
Aquasol Theme Park, Montego Bay
Funland Park, Kingston
Mystic Mountain Jamaica, Ocho Rios

Mexico
Aktun Chen
Barrio Frenesí, Morelos
Barrio Frenesí, Puebla
Bosque de Aragon, Mexico City
Bosque Mágico, Guadalupe
Chankanaab Park
Croco-Cun
DivertiDIF, Chihuahua
Imagic Park, Naucalpan de Juarez
Juegos Mecanicos Del Bosque, Torreon
Kataplum, Mexico City
Lago Mayer Alameda Oriente, Mexico City
Mundo Divertido, Tijuana
Parque de Diversiones Quiqueland, Mexquitic de Carmona
Parque de la Selva, Leon
Parque Bicentenario, Santa Rose Jauregui
Parque Borunda, Ciudad Juarez
Parque Del Refugio, Guadalajara
Parque Eme, Culiacan
Parque Francisco Villa, Mexico City
Parque Guadiana, Durango
Parque Heroes Mexicanos, Aguascalientes
Parque Infantil Cuauhtemoc, Morelia
Parque Infantil Miguel Hidalgo, Aguascalientes
Parque Infantil Ostimuri, Ciudad Obregon
Parque Infantil Sonora, Hermosillo
Parque Los Valentinos, Guadalajara
Parque Plaza Sésamo, Monterrey
Parque Xochipilli, Celaya
Perimagico, Cuatlitlán Itzcalli
Selva Magica, Guadalajara
Selvática - The Adventure Tribe, Puerto Morelos 
Six Flags México, Mexico City
Splash, Nuevo Mexico
Ventura Park, Cancun
Villa Alegria, Guadalajara
Xcaret Park, Riviera Maya
Xel-Ha Park, Solidaridad
Xavage, Riviera Maya
Pensé, Riviera Maya
Xplor Park, Riviera Maya

Trinidad & Tobago
Five Islands Water & Amusement Park, Chagville Beach

United States

Alabama
4D Farm, Cullman
Adventure Island, Orange Beach
Adventureland, Dothan
Alabama Adventure & Splash Adventure, Bessemer
Athens Lions Club Kiddie Carnival, Athens
Spring Park, Tuscumbia
Track Family Fun Park, Gulf Shores
Tropic Falls Theme Park, Foley
Waterville USA, Gulf Shores

Alaska
Pioneer Park, Fairbanks

Arizona
Canyon Coaster Adventure Park, Williams
Castles N' Coasters, Phoenix
Enchanted Island Amusement Park, Phoenix
Funtasticks Family Fun Park, Tucson
Mattel Adventure Park, Glendale (opening 2023)
Schnepf Farms, Queen Creek
Wildlife World, Litchfield Park

Arkansas
Fast Lane Entertainment, Lowell
Funland Amusement Park, North Little Rock
Magic Springs, Hot Springs

California
Northern California
Blackbeard's Family Entertainment Center, Fresno
Boomers, Livermore and Modesto
California's Great America, Santa Clara (closing by 2033)
Children's Fairyland, Oakland
Dell'Osso Family Farm, Lathrop
Funderland Amusement Park, Sacramento
Fun Town at Micke Grove, Lodi
Funderland Amusement Park, Sacramento
Gilroy Gardens Family Theme Park, Gilroy
Golfland, Castro Valley, Milpitas, Roseville, San Jose, and Sunnyvale
Happy Hollow Park and Zoo, San Jose
Heavenly Mountain Resort, South Lake Tahoe
John's Incredible Pizza Company, Fresno, Modesto, and Roseville 
Kiwanis Kiddieland, Merced
Playland Fresno, Fresno
Pixieland Amusement Park, Concord
Rotary Storyland and Playland, Fresno
Santa Cruz Beach Boardwalk, Santa Cruz
Scandia Family Fun Center, Sacramento
Six Flags Discovery Kingdom, Vallejo
Sonoma TrainTown Railroad, Sonoma
Southern California
Adventure City, Anaheim
Alpine Slide at Magic Mountain, Big Bear Lake
Belmont Park, San Diego
Boomers, Irvine, Palm Springs, Santa Maria, and Vista
Castle Amusement Park, Riverside
Disney California Adventure, Anaheim
Disneyland, Anaheim
Fiesta Village Family Fun Park, Colton
Golf 'N' Stuff, Norwalk
Golfland, Anaheim
John's Incredible Pizza Company, Bakersfield, Carson, Montclair and Riverside
Knott's Berry Farm, Buena Park
Legoland California, Carlsbad
Live Oak Canyon Farm, Redlands
Mountasia Family Fun Center, Valencia
Pacific Park, Santa Monica
Scandia Family Fun Center, Victorville
SeaWorld San Diego, San Diego
Sesame Place, Chula Vista
Six Flags Magic Mountain, Valencia
SkyPark at Santa's Village, Skyforest
SpeedZone, City of Industry
SpeedZone Los Angeles, Los Angeles
Universal Studios Hollywood, Universal City

Colorado
Aspen Snowmass Ski Resort, Snowmass Village
Breckenridge Ski Resort, Breckenridge
City Park, Pueblo
Copper Mountain, Frisco
Elitch Gardens, Denver
Glenwood Caverns Adventure Park, Glenwood Springs
Lakeside Amusement Park, Lakeside
Mile High Flea Market, Henderson
Mustang Mountain Coaster, Estes Park
Purgatory Resort, Durango
Santa's Workshop, Cascade
Steamboat Resort, Steamboat Springs
Vail Adventure Ridge, Vail

Connecticut
Lake Compounce, Bristol
Ocean Beach Park, New London
Quassy Amusement Park, Middlebury

Delaware
Funland, Rehoboth Beach
Jungle Jim's Adventure World, Rehoboth Beach

Florida
Central Florida

North Florida
Adventure Landing, Jacksonville, Jacksonville Beach, and St. Augustine
Big Kahuna's Water & Adventure Park, Destin
Cobra Adventure Park, Panama City Beach
Kirby Family Farm, Williston
Race City PCB, Panama City Beach
Sam's Fun City & Sam's Surf City, Pensacola
Silver Springs State Park, Silver Springs
Splash City Adventures, Pensacola
Swampy Jack's Wongo Adventure, Panama City Beach 
Track Recreation Center, Destin
South Florida
American Dream Miami, Miami-Dade County (opening 2026)
Boomers, Boca Raton
FastTrax Entertainment, Fort Myers Beach
Kidstar Park, Port Charlotte
Lion Country Safari, Loxahatchee
Santa's Enchanted Forest, Miami
Uncle Bernie's Amusement Park, Fort Lauderdale

Georgia
All American Fun Park, Albany
Fun Spot Atlanta, Fayetteville
Funopolis, Commerce
FunXcess, Lithonia
Georgia Mountain Coaster, Helen
Keller's Flea Market, Savannah
Lake Winnepesaukah, Rossville
North Georgia State Fair, Marietta
Six Flags Over Georgia, Austell
Wild Adventures, Valdosta
Perry Fair, Warner Robins
Six Flags White Water, Marietta

Hawaii
Maui Golf and Sports Park, Wailuku 
Sea Life Park Hawaii, Oahu

Idaho
Bogus Basin Mountain Recreation Area, Horseshoe Bend
Funland, Idaho Falls
Silverwood Theme Park, Athol
Wahooz Family Fun Zone, Meridian
Yellowstone Bear World, Rexburg

Illinois
Aerie's Resort & Winery, Grafton
Bengtson's Pumpkin Farm, Homer Glen
Enchanted Castle, Lombard
Go Bananas, Norridge
Grady's Family Fun Park, Bloomington
Haunted Trails (entertainment center), Burbank and Joliet
In The Game Hollywood Park, Crestwood
Knight's Action Park, Springfield
Odyssey Fun World, Tinley Park
Pirates' Cove Children's Theme Park, Elk Grove Village
Raging Waves Waterpark, Yorkville
Safari Land, Villa Park
Santa's Village AZoosment Park, East Dundee
Scene75 Entertainment Center, Romeoville
Six Flags Great America, Gurnee
Six Flags Hurricane Harbor Chicago, Gurnee
Six Flags Hurricane Harbor Rockford, Cherry Valley
Sonny Acres Farm, West Chicago

Indiana
Carousel Corner, Noblesville
Columbian Park, Lafayette
Fun Center at Paige's Crossing, Columbia City
Harvest Tyme Pumpkin Patch, Lowell
Holiday World & Splashin' Safari, Santa Claus
Indiana Beach, Monticello
Lark Ranch, Greenfield and Loogootee
Malibu Jack's, Lafayette

Iowa
Adventureland, Altoona
Arnolds Park, Arnolds Park
Lost Island Theme Park, Waterloo
Modern Woodmen Park, Davenport

Kansas
All Star Adventures, Wichita
C.W. Parker Carousel Museum, Leavenworth
Kiddieland, Pittsburg

Kentucky
Beech Bend Park, Bowling Green
Kentucky Kingdom, Louisville
Venture River Water Park, Eddyville
Malibu Jack’s Indoor Theme Park, Ashland, Lexington, and Louisville

Louisiana
Blue Bayou and Dixie Landin', Baton Rouge
Carousel Gardens Amusement Park, New Orleans
Celebration Station, Baton Rouge
Party Central Family Fun Center, Bossier City

Maine
Funtown Splashtown USA, Saco
Palace Playland, Old Orchard Beach
York's Wild Kingdom, York Beach

Maryland
Adventure Park USA, New Market
Baja Amusements, Ocean City
Glen Echo Park, Glen Echo
Hebron Fireman's Carnival, Heborn
Jolly Roger Amusement Park, Ocean City
Jolly Roger at the Pier, Ocean City
Laugh Out Loud Stations, Greenbelt
Leonardtown Volunteer Fire Department Carnival Grounds, Leonardtown
Sharptown Firemen's Carnival, Sharptown
Six Flags America, Upper Marlboro
Tilt Studio, Hagerstown (inside Valley Mall)
Trimper's Rides, Ocean City
Wisp Resort, McHenry

Massachusetts
Berkshire East, Charlemont
Edaville Family Theme Park, Carver
Jiminy Peak Mountain Resort, Hancock
Salem Willows, Salem
Six Flags New England, Agawam

Michigan
Airway Fun Center, Portage
Arzo Sports & Fun Park, Alpena
Cedar Valley's Wild Frontier Fun Park, Comins
CJ Barrymore's Family Entertainment Center, Clinton Township
Craig's Cruisers Family Fun Center, Mears and Wyoming

Michigan's Adventure, Muskegon
Nelis' Dutch Village, Holland

Minnesota
Como Town, St. Paul
Kiddie Land, Cormorant
Nickelodeon Universe, Bloomington
Paul Bunyan Land, Brainerd
Spirit Mountain, Duluth
Valleyfair, Shakopee

Mississippi
Brookhaven Exchange Club Park, Brookhaven
Kamper Park, Hattiesburg
Paradise Pier Fun Park, Biloxi

Missouri
Branson Mountain Adventure Park, Branson
Branson Sawmill, Branson
Miner Mike's Adventure Town, Osage Beach
Paradise Park Family Entertainment Center, Kansas City
PowerPlay Family Entertainment Center, Kansas City
Shepherd's Adventure Park, Branson
Silver Dollar City, Branson
Six Flags St. Louis, Eureka
St. Louis's Incredible Pizza Company, St. Louis, Missouri
Tilt Studio, Joplin (inside Northpark Mall)
Track Family Fun Parks, Branson
Worlds of Fun, Kansas City

Montana
 Flathead Lake Alpine Coaster, Lakeside

Nebraska
Fun-Plex, Omaha

Nevada
Adventuredome, Las Vegas
Buffalo Bill's, Primm
Idlewild Park, Reno
Las Vegas Mini Gran Prix, Las Vegas
New York-New York Hotel and Casino, Las Vegas
The Strat, Las Vegas

New Hampshire
Attitash Mountain Resort, Bartlett
Canobie Lake Park, Salem
Chuckster's Family Fun Park, Chicester
Cranmore Mountain Adventure Park, North Conway
Clark's Trading Post, Lincoln
Funworld Game Center, Nashua
Gunstock Mountain Resort, Gilford
Runway Fun Park, Swanzey
Santa's Village, Jefferson
Story Land, Glen

New Jersey
Casino Pier, Seaside Heights
Clementon Park and Splash World, Clementon
Diggerland, West Berlin
Fantasy Island Amusement Park, Beach Haven
Funplex, Mount Laurel
Gillian's Wonderland Pier, Ocean City
iPlay America, Freehold
Jenkinson's Boardwalk, Point Pleasant Beach
Keansburg Amusement Park, Keansburg
Land of Make Believe, Hope
Morey's Piers, Wildwood
Mountain Creek Waterpark, Vernon
Nickelodeon Universe Theme Park, East Rutherford
Playland's Castaway Cove, Ocean City
Six Flags Great Adventure, Jackson
Steel Pier, Atlantic City
Storybook Land, Egg Harbor Township
Wild West City, Byram Township, New Jersey

New Mexico
Cliff's Amusement Park, Albuquerque
Ruidoso Winter Park, Ruidoso
Western Playland, Sunland Park

New York
Downstate New York
Adventureland, Farmingdale
Adventurer's Park, Brooklyn
Bayville Adventure Park, Bayville
Deno's Wonder Wheel Amusement Park, Coney Island, Brooklyn
Fantasy Forest at the Flushing Meadows Carousel, Flushing
Kids 'N Action, Brooklyn
Luna Park, Coney Island, Brooklyn
Playland, Rye
Victorian Gardens, Central Park, Manhattan

Upstate New York
Castle Fun Center, Chester
Eldridge Park, Elmira
Enchanted Forest Water Safari, Old Forge
Great Escape & Splashwater Kingdom, Lake George
Greek Peak Mountain Resort, Cortland
Holiday Valley, Ellicottville
Huck Finn's Playland, Albany
Legoland New York, Goshen
Midway State Park, Maple Springs
Lake George Expedition Park, Lake George
Mount Van Hoevenberg, Lake Placid
Niagara Amusement Park & Splash World, Grand Island
Olcott Beach Carousel Park, Olcott
Santa's Workshop, Wilmington
Seabreeze Amusement Park, Rochester
Six Flags Darien Lake, Darien
Sylvan Beach Amusement Park, Sylvan Beach
TurtleBoo, Spring Valley
Whiteface, North Elba

North Carolina
Carowinds, Charlotte 
Deadwood, Williamston
Santa's Land, Cherokee
Scaly Mountain Outdoor Center, Scaly Mountain
Tweetsie Railroad, Boone
Wilderness Run Alpine Coaster, Banner Elk
Yogi Bear's Jellystone Park Camp-Resort, Bostic

North Dakota
Lucy's Amusement Park, Minot
Super Slide Amusement Park, Bismarck

Ohio
Adventure Zone, Geneva-on-the-Lake
Cedar Point, Sandusky
Euclid Beach Park Grand Carousel, Euclid
Fun 'n' Stuff, Macedonia
FunTimes Fun Park, Alliance
Hall of Fame Village, Canton
Haunted Hoochie, Pataskala
Howard's Apples Farm Market, Bainbridge
Kings Island, Kings Mills
Memphis Kiddie Park, Brooklyn
Playzone Toledo, Toledo
Rides At Adventure Cove in Columbus Zoo and Aquarium, Powell
Richland Carrosuel Park, Mansfield
Scene75 Entertainment Center, Dayton and Dublin
Sluggers & Putters, Canal Fulton
Stricker's Grove, Ross
Tilt Studio, St. Clairsville (inside Ohio Valley Mall)
Tuscora Park, New Philadelphia

Oklahoma
Frontier City, Oklahoma City
Incredible Pizza Company, Warr Acres
Kiddie Park, Bartlesville
Tulsa's Incredible Pizza Company, Tulsa

Oregon
Bullwinkle's, Wilsonville
Captain Kid Amusement Park, Seaside
Enchanted Forest, Turner
Oaks Amusement Park, Portland

Pennsylvania
Arnold's Family Fun Center, Phoenixville
Bushkill Park, Easton
Camelback Mountain Resort, Tannersville
Carousel Village at Indian Walk, Wrightstown
Conneaut Lake Park, Conneaut Lake
DelGrosso's Amusement Park, Tipton
Dorney Park & Wildwater Kingdom, Allentown (Dorneyville)
Dutch Wonderland, Lancaster
Fun Fore All, Cranberry Township
Hersheypark, Hershey
Idlewild and Soak Zone, Ligonier
Kennywood, West Mifflin
Knoebels Amusement Resort, Elysburg
Lakemont Park, Altoona
Sesame Place, Langhorne
Waldameer Park, Erie
Kalahari Resorts, Pocono Manor

Rhode Island
Adventureland Family Fun Park, Narragansett
Atlantic Beach Park, Westerly

South Carolina
Broadway Grand Prix, Myrtle Beach
Family Kingdom Amusement Park, Myrtle Beach
The Funplex Myrtle Beach, Myrtle Beach
Mr. Putty's Fun Park, Tega Cay
O.D. Pavilion Amusement Park, North Myrtle Beach
Pavilion Park, Myrtle Beach
Pedroland, Dillon
WonderWorks, Myrtle Beach

South Dakota
Flags & Wheels Indoor Racing, Rapid City
Fort Hays Chuckwagon, Rapid City
Rush Mountain Adventure Park, Keystone
Storybook Land, Aberdeen
Thunder Road Family Fun Park, Aberdeen

Tennessee
Anakeesta, Gatlinburg
Dig'n Zone Sevierville (opening 2023)
Dollywood, Pigeon Forge
Fun Stop, Pigeon Forge
Goats on the Roof of the Smokies, Pigeon Forge
Incredible Pizza Company, Cordova
The Island in Pigeon Forge, Pigeon Forge
Jurassic Jungle Boat Ride, Pigeon Forge
NASCAR Speedpark, Sevierville
Ober Gatlinburg, Gatlinburg
Rocky Top Mountain Coaster Pigeon Forge
Rowdy Bear Mountain Gatlinburg
Rowdy Bear Ridge Adventure Park, Pigeon Forge
Sir Goony's Fun Zone, Chattanooga
SkyLand Ranch, Sevierville
Smoky Mountain Alpine Coaster, Pigeon Forge
Wilderness at the Smokies, Sevierville (opening 2023)

Texas
Central Texas
Austin's Park N Pizza, Pflugerville
Camp Fimfo Texas Hill Country, Canyon Lake
Cotaland, Austin
Incredible Pizza Company, San Antonio
Kiddie Park Of San Antonio, San Antonio
Landa Park, New Braunfels
Morgan's Wonderland, San Antonio
SeaWorld San Antonio, San Antonio
Six Flags Fiesta Texas, San Antonio
Tom Foolerys Adventure Park, Round Rock
ZDT's Amusement Park, Seguin

Coastal Texas
Big Rivers Waterpark & Adventures, New Caney
Downtown Aquarium, Houston
Elise's Family Fun Center, Winnie
Funplex, Houston
Galveston Island Historic Pleasure Pier, Galveston
Grand Texas Theme Park, New Caney (opening 2023)
Gravity Park, South Padre Island
In The Game Funtrackers, Corpus Christi
iT'Z Family Food & Fun, Houston and Pasadena
P-6 Farms, Montgomery
Kemah Boardwalk, Kemah
Outlaw Pass, Victoria
Tilt Studio, Beaumont (inside Parkdale Mall) and Katy (inside Katy Mills)

Mountain Time Zone Texas
Oasis Lanes & Amusement Center, El Paso

Northern Texas
Alley Cats, Hurst
Mr. Gatti's Pizza, Abilene
iT'Z Family Food & Fun, Euless
Joyland Amusement Park, Lubbock
Mountasia Family Fun Center, North Richland Hills
Prairie Playland, Grand Prairie
Richland Chambers, Winkler (opening 2023)
Six Flags Over Texas, Arlington
Traders Village, Grand Prairie
Universal Studios, Frisco
Wonderland Park, Amarillo
YesterLand Farm, Canton

Utah
Lagoon Amusement Park, Farmington
Park City Mountain Resort, Park City	
Ricochet Canyon, West Jordan
Seven Peaks Fun Center, Lehi
Snowbird, Sandy
Evermore Park, Pleasant Grove

Vermont
Bromley, Vermont's Summer Adventure, Peru
Killington Resort, Killington
Okemo Mountain Resort, Ludlow
Quechee Gorge Village, Quechee

Virginia
Atlantic Fun Park, Virginia Beach
Busch Gardens Williamsburg, Williamsburg
Fun Land of Fredericksburg, Fredericksburg
Go-Karts Plus, Williamsburg
Kings Dominion, Doswell
Motor World, Virginia Beach

Washington
Country Mercantile, Pasco 
Family Fun Center & Bullwinkle's Restaurant, Edmonds and Tukwila
Leavenworth Adventure Park, Leavenworth (opening 2023)
Pier 57, Seattle 
Remlinger Farms, Carnation
Riverfront Park, Spokane
Sport Wenatchee, Wenatchee (opening 2023)
Washington State Fair, Puyallup
Wild Waves Theme Park, Federal Way

West Virginia
Camden Park, Huntington

Wisconsin
Bay Beach Amusement Park, Green Bay
Knucklehead's Bowling & Family Entertainment, Wisconsin Dells
Little Amerricka, Marshall
Mt. Olympus Water & Theme Park, Wisconsin Dells
Noah's Ark Waterpark, Wisconsin Dells
Timbavatvi Wildlife Park/Storybook Gardens, Wisconsin Dells
Timber Falls Adventure Park, Wisconsin Dells
Tom Foolerys Adventure Park, Wisconsin Dells

Wyoming
Cowboy Carousel Center, Buffalo
Snow King Mountain, Jackson Hole

Guam
Funtastic Park, Guam

Puerto Rico
Cayo Lobos Marine Park, Cayo Lobos
Children's Dream Park, Añasco
Rain Forest Zipline Park, Bayamón
Parque de las Ciencias, Bayamón
Villa Campestre, Guaynabo

South America

Argentina
Parque de la Ciudad, Buenos Aires
Parque de la Costa, Tigre, Buenos Aires Province

Brazil

Beach Park, Fortaleza, Ceará
Beto Carrero World, Penha, Santa Catarina
Cidade da Criança, São Bernardo do Campo, São Paulo
Eco Parque, Bahia
Hopi Hari, Vinhedo, São Paulo
Hot Park, Goiás
, Suzano, São Paulo
Mirabilandia, Pernambuco
Nicolândia Center Park, Brasília
Parque Guanabara, Belo Horizonte
Parque Marisa, São Paulo
Play City, Rio de Janeiro
Thermas dos Laranjais, São Paulo
Wet 'n Wild, Vinhedo, São Paulo

Chile
Fantasilandia, Santiago

Colombia

Antioquía
Parque Norte, Medellín

Bogota
Divercity.
Mundo Aventura.
Salitre Magico.

Cundinamarca 
Parque Jaime Duque, Tocancipá.

Quindío
National Coffee Park, Quindío
PANACA, Quindío

Ecuador
Vulqano Park, Quito

Venezuela
Aguamania, Maracaibo, Zulia
La Venezuela de Antier, Mérida, Mérida
Los Aleros, Mérida, Mérida
Musipan, Margarita Island, Nueva Esparta
Parque El Agua, Margarita Island, Nueva Esparta
Parque Kariña, Piritu, Anzoategui
Diverxity, Caracas
 DUNAS, Valencia http://dunas.com.ve

See also
List of amusement parks
List of defunct amusement parks
List of tourist attractions worldwide
List of water parks in the Americas
Tourist attractions in the United States
Family entertainment center

References

Americas-related lists
North America-related lists
South America-related lists
Americas
Lists of buildings and structures in North America
Lists of buildings and structures in South America